Unakoti, famously known as Angkor Wat of the North-East, is a sculptural emblem and ancient Shaivite place that hosts rock carvings figures and images of gods and goddesses. It is a place of worship with huge rock reliefs celebrating Shiva. Unakoti literally means "one less one crore" or "koti" in Hindi and Bengali. In the local Kokborok language, it is called Subrai Khung. It is yet to be recognized as a UNESCO world heritage site (put in tentative list in 2022) and the prime tourist spot of Unakoti District, in the Kailashahar Subdivision of the North-eastern Indian state of Tripura. 

In the name of Cambodia's Angkor Wat temple, Unakoti is called "Angkor Wat of the North-East" . These sculptures are carved on a hill of the Raghunandan hills of Tripura.  It is known that there are about ninety-nine lakh ninety-nine thousand nine hundred and ninety-nine idols that can be found here.

Iconography

Description 
The images found at Unakoti are of two types: namely rock-carved figures and stone images. Among the rock-cut carvings, the central Shiva head and gigantic Ganesha figures deserve special mention. The central Shiva head known as Unakotiswara Kal Bhairava is about 30 feet high including an embroidered head-dress which itself is 10 feet high. On each side of the head-dress of the central Shiva, there are two full-size female figures - one of Durga standing on a lion and another female figure on the other side. In addition, three enormous images of Nandi Bull are found half-buried in the ground. There are various other stone as well as rock-cut images at Unakoti.

Legend 
According to Hindu mythology, Lord Shiva once spent a night here en route to Kashi. 99,99,999 gods and goddesses followed him. He had asked his followers to wake up before sunrise and make their way towards Kashi. Unfortunately, none awoke, except Lord Shiva himself. Before he set out for Kashi alone, he put a curse on the others, turning them to stone and that is how the site got its name.

Local tribals believe that the maker of these idols was Kallu Kumhar. He was a devotee of Parvati and wanted to accompany Shiva-Parvati to their abode on Mount Kailash. On Parvati's insistence, Shiva agreed to take Kallu to Kailash, but for this a condition was kept that he would have to make one crore idols of Shiva in one night. Kallu got involved in this work like a man of his tune. But when dawn broke, the idols turned out to be one less than one crore. Adamant on getting rid of this trouble named Kallu, Shiva left Kallu the potter with his idols in Unakoti, making this an excuse and kept on walking.

Festival
Every year a big fair popularly known as Ashokastami Mela is held in the month of April. The festival is visited by thousands of pilgrims. Another smaller festival takes place in January.

Location
Unakoti lies 178 km to the northeast from Agartala which has the closest airport, 8 km to the east from Kailashahar, district headquarters of Unakoti district, 148 km to the south-east from Silchar. The nearest railway station is 19.6  km away at Dharmanagar railway station on the Lumding–Sabroom section. From Dharmanagar railway station it takes about 30–40 minutes by car. Travelling from capital town Agartala has become much easier nowadays. The morning train from Agartala reaches Dharmanagar before 10 am. The afternoon train from Dharmanagar reaches Agartala by 8 PM.

Preservation
The site has suffered centuries of neglect causing degradation and loss of considerable scale to the rock art. Since its adoption by the ASI (Archaeological Survey of India) as a heritage site, the situation has slightly improved, though a lot of work including substantial excavation remains to be undertaken. The Centre has recently granted Rs 12 crore to the state for developing the area, 178  km from here, as a major tourist destination.

The site was added to the tentative list of the UNESCO World Heritage Site in December 2022.

See also 

 Hindu pilgrimage sites
 National Geological Monuments of India
 List of Hindu temples
 Tourism in India
 Yatra

References
UNAKOTI: A HISTORICAL PLACE IN TRIPURA!
THE MYSTERIOUS UNAKOTI: AN OPEN AIR ART GALLERY IN TRIPURA!

Unakoti district
Archaeological sites in Tripura
Hindu pilgrimage sites
Tourist attractions in Tripura
Tourism in Northeast India
Rock art in India
Rock reliefs in India
Shiva in art
World Heritage Tentative List for India